The 2012 Jelajah Malaysia, a cycling stage race that took place in Malaysia. It was held from 8 to 13 May 2012. There were six stages with a total of 1,042.1 kilometres. In fact, the race was sanctioned by the Union Cycliste Internationale as a 2.2 category race and was part of the 2011–12 UCI Asia Tour calendar.

Yusuf Abrekov of Uzbekistan won the race, followed by Jai Crawford of Australia second and Yasuharu Nakajima of Japan third overall. Adiq Husainie Othman of Malaysia won the points classification and Dadi Suryadi of Indonesia won the mountains classification. Putra Perjuangan won the team classification.

Stages

Classification leadership

Stage results

Stage 1
8 May 2012 — Merdeka Stadium, Kuala Lumpur to Bandar Baru Kampar,

Stage 2
9 May 2012 — Bandar Baru Kampar to Kulim,

Stage 3
10 May 2012 — Kulim to FELDA Chuping,

Stage 4
11 May 2012 — Kangar to Sungai Petani,

Stage 5
12 May 2012 — Sungai Petani to Ipoh,

Stage 6 
13 May 2012 — Ipoh to Merdeka Square, Kuala Lumpur,

Final standings

General classification

Points classification

Mountains classification

Team classification

Asian rider classification

Asian team classification

Malaysian rider classification

Malaysian team classification

List of teams and riders
A total of 18 teams were invited to participate in the 2012 Jelajah Malaysia. Out of 117 riders, a total of 84 riders made it to the finish in Merdeka Square, Kuala Lumpur.

  Mohd Shahrul Mat Amin
  Mohamed Harrif Salleh
  Mohamed Zamri Salleh
  Mohd Saufi Mat Senan
  Shinichi Fukushima
  Mohd Nor Umardi Rosdi
Aisan Racing Team
  Takeaki Ayabe
  Kenichi Suzuki
  Kazuhiro Mori
  Yasuharu Nakajima
  Shinpei Fukuda
  Nozomu Kimori
CCN Cycling Team
  Robert Gitelis
  Timo Scholz
  Lex Nederlof
  Fito Bako Prilanji
  Muhammad Nurhaimin Awang
  Muhammad Raihan Abd Aziz

  Thomas Robinson
  Kane Walker
  Kyle Marwood
  Alex Carver
  Joel Pearson
  Nicholas Sanderson

  Andrey Mizurov
  Alex Coutts
  Jai Crawford
  Lee Rodgers
  Chang Wei Kei

Uzbekistan Suren Team
  Vadim Shaekov
  Valeriy Kobzarenko
  Yusuf Abrekov
  Volodymyr Starchyk
  Azamat Turaev
  Volodymyr Zagorodniy
Malaysia Development Team
  Adiq Husainie Othman
  Mohammad Al-Ghazali Abd Hamid
  Wan Syazwan Afiq Wan Shahril Anwar
  Ahmad Fahmi Farhan Ahmad Fuat
  Mohd Fakhruddin Daud
Kazakhstan Cycling Federation
  Sergey Kuzmin
  Ivan Chernyavskiy
  Ilya Chaplygin
  Ivan Sivash
Malaysian Armed Forces
  Mohd Nur Rizuan Zainal
  Mohd Shahrul Nizam Che Shamsudin
  Mohd Fadhli Anwar Mohd Fauzi
  Mohd Shahrul Afiza Fauizan
  Amirul Aswandi Amran
Royal Malaysia Police
  Mohd Fauzan Ahmad Lutfi
  Nik Mohd Azwan Zulkifle
  Mohd Salahuddin Mat Saman
  Ahmad Huzairi Abu Bakar
Kedah
  Khairul Azhar

Kuala Lumpur
  Ahmad Fallanie Ali
  Suhardi Hassan
  Wan Mohamed Najmee Wan Mohammed
  Thum Weng Kin
  Mohammed Razif Salleh
  Hoh Jin Cheng
Negeri Sembilan
  Amirul Anuar Jafri
  Mohd Ekbar Zamanhuri
  Abdul Rashid Ibrahim
Selangor
  Muhammad Rauf Nur Misbah
  Muhammad Akmal Amrun
  Muhammad Faiz Izzuddin Omar
  Abdul Azim Abdul Latif
  Muhammad Hazwan Azmen
Terengganu
  Muhammad Zulhilmie Afif Ahmad Zamri
  Muhammad Khairul Azizi Abdullah
  Sofian Nabil Omar Mohd Bakri
  Mohamad Harif Murlis
  Mohd Fahmi Irfan M. Zailani
  Che Ku Mohd Wafiuddin Che Ku Zuki

Polygon Sweet Nice
  Hari Fitrianto
  Dani Lesmana
  Bambang Suryadi
  Dealton Nur Arif Prayogo
  Agung Riyanto
  Antonius Christopher Tjondrokusumo
Pure Black Racing Team
  Roman van Uden
  James Williamson
  Michael Torckler
  Louis Crosby
  Shem Rodger
Putra Perjuangan
  Tonton Susanto
  Suherman Heryadi
  Dadi Suryadi
  Ali Shahbana Agung
  Arin Iswana
  Chelly Aristya
Team LBC Cycling
  Mark Julius S. Bonzo
  Jemico Brioso
  Jay Bob P. Pagnanawon
  John Gerald Mendoza
  Kelvin John T. Mendoza
  George Luis Oconer

External links
 
 Palmares at cyclingarchives.com
 Results at cqranking.com

Jelajah Malaysia
Jelajah Malaysia
Jelajah Malaysia, 2012